Ibrahim Musa Kosepa (born 17 September 1995) is an Indonesian professional footballer who plays as a forward or winger for Liga 2 club Persela Lamongan.

Club career

Persela Lamongan
He was signed for Persela Lamongan to play in Liga 1 in the 2021 season. Ibrahim made his league debut on 4 September 2021 in a match against PSIS Semarang at the Wibawa Mukti Stadium, Cikarang.

Career statistics

Club

Notes

References

External links
 Ibrahim Kosepa at Soccerway
 Ibrahim Kosepa at Liga Indonesia

1995 births
Living people
Indonesian footballers
Persela Lamongan players
Association football forwards
People from Sorong